Albert Serrán Polo (born 17 July 1984) is a Spanish professional footballer who plays as a defender for CF Montañesa. He can occupy all three defensive positions.

Club career
Born in Barcelona, Catalonia, Serrán was a product of RCD Espanyol's youth system. He appeared in three La Liga games with the team, his debut coming on 11 March 2007 in a 1–1 away draw against Racing de Santander; during his tenure at the Estadi Cornellà-El Prat, however, he was mainly registered with the B-side.

Deemed surplus to requirements following Tintín Márquez's appointment to the managerial post at the Estadi Olímpic Lluís Companys, Serrán signed a three-year contract with Swansea City in the Football League Championship, with teammate Jordi Gómez also making the move on a loan deal. The link contained a buy-back clause that allowed Espanyol to re-sign the player at a later date, but it was later revealed that such clause did not exist; however, the Pericos retained the first option should the Welsh club wish to sell in future.

Serrán was released by Swansea at the end of the 2010–11 season, which ended in Premier League promotion. He joined AEK Larnaca FC in Cyprus shortly after, having already reached an agreement with the team in May.

After five years abroad, Serrán returned to Spain and signed for AD Alcorcón in Segunda División. Subsequently, he moved back to the Cypriot First Division, first with Anorthosis Famagusta FC then former club AEK.

Serrán began negotiations with Albanian Superliga champions FK Kukësi on 17 June 2017. He was presented three days later as a replacement for Albi Alla, penning a one-year deal with an option of a further one worth €60,000 which made him one of the highest-paid players in Albanian football history. His contract also included a clause in which the club would find a school for his six-year-old daughter, and he spoke of the "dream of playing in the UEFA Champions League" during his presentation; on 20 July, however, he was released by mutual consent alleging personal problems.

In September 2017, 33-year-old Serrán signed with Moroccan club Chabab Rif Al Hoceima. On 31 August of the following year, he joined Indian Super League's Bengaluru FC on a one-year contract.

Club statistics

Honours
Bengaluru
Indian Super League: 2018–19

References

External links

1984 births
Living people
Footballers from Barcelona
Spanish footballers
Association football defenders
La Liga players
Segunda División players
Segunda División B players
Tercera División players
RCD Espanyol B footballers
RCD Espanyol footballers
FC Cartagena footballers
AD Alcorcón footballers
CF Montañesa players
English Football League players
Swansea City A.F.C. players
Cypriot First Division players
AEK Larnaca FC players
Anorthosis Famagusta F.C. players
Doxa Katokopias FC players
FK Kukësi players
Botola players
Indian Super League players
Bengaluru FC players
Spanish expatriate footballers
Expatriate footballers in Wales
Expatriate footballers in Cyprus
Expatriate footballers in Albania
Expatriate footballers in Morocco
Expatriate footballers in India
Spanish expatriate sportspeople in Wales
Spanish expatriate sportspeople in Cyprus
Spanish expatriate sportspeople in Albania
Spanish expatriate sportspeople in Morocco
Spanish expatriate sportspeople in India